Newtontoppen (Newton Peak) is the largest and highest mountain in Svalbard, at 1,713 m. Its peak is the highest point on Svalbard. It is located at the north east corner on the island of Spitsbergen in the Chydeniusfjella range. The nearest settlement is the formerly Soviet coal mining settlement, Pyramiden.The mountain is mostly made of Silurian granite. The mountain was first ascended by Helge Backlund on 4 August 1900.

Etymology 
The mountain was named after Isaac Newton in 1898. The surrounding mountains were named after other famous astronomers and mathematicians the same year.

See also
 List of European ultra prominent peaks

References

Mountains of Spitsbergen